Diogo Dias Melgás (often Melgaz) (Cuba (Portugal), 1638 - Évora, 1700) was a Portuguese composer of late-Renaissance sacred polyphony.

Life
Diogo Dias Melgás was born in Cuba, Alentejo, on 14 April 1638. He was a choirboy at the Colégio da Claustra in Évora in 1646. He took holy orders at the Cathedral of Évora, where he stayed the rest of his life, being a student of Manuel Rebelo, and holding the position of mestre de capela for about 30 years. He died blind and extremely poor on 3 February 1700. He was the last of the great Portuguese polyphonic masters, who began to flourish in Évora in the second half of the sixteenth century.

Work
A large part of Melgás's work is lost. The surviving works - masses, motets, graduals - are kept in the archives of the Cathedrals of Évora and Lisbon, and were published in modern notation by the Fundação Calouste Gulbenkian in 1978 (Opera Omnia, Portugaliae Musica XXXII).

Recordings
1994, Music of the Portuguese Renaissance, Pro Cantione Antiqua, Hyperion CDA66715 
includes 14 works by Melgás
2004, A Golden Age of Portuguese Music, The Sixteen, CORO COR16020
includes 3 works by Melgás
2008, The Golden Age, The King's Singers, Signum Classics
includes 2 works by Melgás

References
Enciclopédia Verbo Luso-Brasileira de Cultura, vol. 19, "Melgaz (Diogo Dias)", ed. Verbo, Lisboa/São Paulo, 1998

External links
 

1638 births
1700 deaths
People from Cuba, Portugal
Portuguese Baroque composers
Renaissance composers
17th-century Portuguese people
17th-century classical composers
Portuguese male classical composers
17th-century male musicians